José Dumont (born 1 August 1950 in Bananeiras, Paraíba) is a Brazilian TV and movie actor, best known for his role as the family father in Behind the Sun (Abril Despedaçado), an award-winning film of director Walter Salles. More recently, he has been lionised for his role as the slick artist agent-entrepreneur in the movie 2 Filhos de Francisco.

Born in the state of Paraíba, in Brazilian Northeast, Dumont has the typical physique du rôle of its inhabitants, and because of this is often chosen for interpreting them. He began his award-studded acting career in the theater and cinema, in 1975. He became better known throughout the country by his noted participation in the films Lúcio Flávio – Passageiro da Agonia, directed by Hector Babenco in 1977, and Gaijin, directed by Tizuka Yamasaki, in 1980. His first awards came in 1979, as the best actor in the film festivals of Gramado and Brasília, in O Homem que Virou Suco, directed by João Batista de Andrade, and in the film festival of Cuba. In 2004 he was again awarded as best actor in Narradores de Javé.

Dumont is also very much sought after as an actor in TV series and soap operas. He is in the permanent cast of Rede Globo. His most noted appearances were in América (2005), Terra Nostra (1999), Tocaia Grande (1995), Guerra Sem Fim (1993), Amazônia (1991), A História de Ana Raio e Zé Trovão (1990), Pantanal (1990), Grande Sertão: Veredas (1985), Corpo a Corpo (1984), Padre Cícero (1984), Fernando da Gata (1983), Bandidos da Falange (1983) and Lampião e Maria Bonita (1982), this last being his first TV appearance, with a role as lieutenant Zé Rufino in the story about the bandit (cangaceiro) Lampião.

Main filmography
  (2017) – Seu Nery
 Era o Hotel Cambridge (2016) – Apolo
 Trash – A Esperança vem do Lixo (2014) – Carlos
 A Hora e a Vez de Augusto Matraga (2012) – Padre Zequiel
 O Sonho de Inacim (2009) – Miguel
 2 Filhos de Francisco (2005)
 Cidade Baixa (2005) – Lower City
 Olga (2004)
 Narradores de Javé (2003) – The Storytellers
 Abril Despedaçado (2001) – Behind the Sun
 At Play in the Fields of the Lord (1991)
 Running Out of Luck (1987)
 A Hora da Estrela (1985) – Hour of the Star
 Avaete, Seed of Revenge (1985)
 Os Trapalhões e o Mágico de Oróz (1984) – The Tramps and the Wizard of Oróz
 Memórias do Cárcere (1984) – Memoirs of Prison
 O Homem que Virou Suco (1981)
 Gaijin - Os Caminhos da Liberdade (1980) – Gaijin, a Brazilian Odissey
 Colonel Delmiro Gouveia (1978)
 Lúcio Flávio, o Passageiro da Agonia (1977)
 Morte e Vida Severina (1977)

TV 
 2016 Velho Chico – Zé Pirangueiro
 2015 I Love Paraisópolis – Seu Expedito Rufinno
 2014 Milagres de Jesus – Job
 2013 Dona Xepa – Esmeraldino Losano
 2012 O Milagre dos Pássaros – Capitão Lindolfo Ezequiel
 2012 Fora de Controle – Macieiro
 2010 Ribeirão do Tempo – Romeu Fulgêncio
 2008 Os Mutantes - Caminhos do Coração – Teófilo Magalhães (Téo) 
 2007 Caminhos do Coração – Teófilo Magalhães (Téo) 
 2007 Luz do Sol – Fausto (Rede Record) (Participação Especial)
 2006 Cidadão Brasileiro – Benvindo Ferraz (Rede Record)
 2005 América – Bóia
 1999 Terra Nostra – Batista
 1997 Mandacaru – Teco (Rede Manchete)
 1995 Tocaia Grande – Né Cachorrão (Rede Manchete)
 1993 Guerra sem Fim – Penteado (Rede Manchete)
 1991 Amazônia – Raimundo (Rede Manchete)
 1990 A História de Ana Raio e Zé Trovão – Mané Coxo (Rede Manchete)
 1990 Rosa dos Rumos – Antenor (Rede Manchete)
 1990 Pantanal – Gil (pai de Juma) (Rede Manchete)
 1988 Olho por Olho – Eurípedes Peçanha (Rede Manchete)
 1987 Carmem – Aluísio (Rede Manchete)
 1985 Grande sertão: veredas – Zé Bebelo
 1985 De Quina pra Lua – Cróvis/Peixoto
 1984 Corpo a Corpo – Darci
 1984 Padre Cícero – Franco Rabelo
 1983 Fernando da Gata – Fernando da Gata
 1983 Bandidos da Falange – Valdir
 1982 Lampião e Maria Bonita – Tenente Zé Rufino
 1981 Morte e Vida Severina – Severino

Awards 
 Candango Trophy, from Brasilia Festival
 1998: Best Actor, for Kenoma
 1985: Best Actor, for Starring Hour
 1980: Best Actor, for The Man Who Turned Juice

 Kikito de Ouro, of the Gramado Festival
 1984: Best Actor, for The Ghostly Bahian
 1981: Best Actor, for The Man Who Turned Juice
 1980: Best actor, for Gaijin – the paths of freedom

 Havana Festival
 1980: Best Actor, for The Phantom Bahian

 Brazilian Film Festival of Miami
 1999: Best Actor, for Kenoma

 APCA Trophy
 1999: Best Actor, for Kenoma

References

External links

 José Dumont. Biography. CAFRI Cinema site (In Portuguese)

1950 births
Living people
Brazilian male film actors
Brazilian male stage actors
Brazilian male telenovela actors
People from Belém